Zarcosia is a genus of beetles belonging to the family Aderidae.

The species of this genus are found in Southeastern Asia.

Species:

Zarcosia armipes 
Zarcosia barclayi 
Zarcosia barlayi 
Zarcosia batuensis 
Zarcosia bedosae 
Zarcosia bipartita 
Zarcosia brunnea 
Zarcosia capitalis 
Zarcosia cephalica 
Zarcosia deharvengi 
Zarcosia dentatifemur 
Zarcosia discoidalis 
Zarcosia genjiensis 
Zarcosia gerstmeieri 
Zarcosia glaucescens 
Zarcosia grandiceps 
Zarcosia holosericea 
Zarcosia ilonae 
Zarcosia intermedia 
Zarcosia javana 
Zarcosia kempi 
Zarcosia lemairei 
Zarcosia longithorax 
Zarcosia lucifuga 
Zarcosia luteitarsis 
Zarcosia malayana 
Zarcosia nathani 
Zarcosia nigrofasciata 
Zarcosia obscuricornis 
Zarcosia palliditarsis 
Zarcosia patucki 
Zarcosia picina 
Zarcosia plumbea 
Zarcosia rubrobasalis 
Zarcosia rufotestacea 
Zarcosia schawalleri 
Zarcosia sellata 
Zarcosia sexdentata 
Zarcosia sinuata 
Zarcosia spinifemur 
Zarcosia srilankaensis 
Zarcosia subglaber 
Zarcosia subrobusta 
Zarcosia subrufa 
Zarcosia sumatrensis 
Zarcosia testaceitarsis 
Zarcosia troglodytes 
Zarcosia uncifer 
Zarcosia weigeli

References

Aderidae
Polyphaga genera